The Uruguayan Chess Championship (Campeonato Uruguayo de Ajedrez) is the national chess championship of Uruguay.

{| class="sortable wikitable"
! Year !! Winner
|-
| 1927||José Gabarain
|-
| 1928||Héctor Anaya Oger
|-
| 1929||Julio C. Balparda Muró
|-
| 1931||Carlos Hounié Fleurquin
|-
| 1934||Julio C. Balparda Muró
|-
| 1935||Carlos Hounié Fleurquin
|-
| 1936||Julio C. Balparda Muró
|-
| 1937||Alfredo F. Olivera
|-
| 1938||Ernesto J. Rotunno
|-
| 1939||Ernesto J. Rotunno
|-
| 1940||Arturo Liebstein
|-
| 1941||José Cánepa
|-
| 1942||Arturo Liebstein
|-
| 1943||Arturo Liebstein
|-
| 1944||Alfredo F. Olivera
|-
| 1945||Lorenzo R. Bauzá
|-
| 1946||Carlos Hounié Fleurquin
|-
| 1947||Alfredo F. Olivera
|-
| 1948||Luis Roux Cabral
|-
| 1949||Santiago Trasmonte
|-
| 1950||Lorenzo R. Bauzá
|-
| 1951||Héctor Corral, Lorenzo R. Bauzá
|-
| 1952||Santiago Trasmonte
|-
| 1953||Walter Estrada Degrandi
|-
| 1954||Lorenzo R. Bauzá
|-
| 1955||Lorenzo R. Bauzá
|-
| 1956||Fernando Rubio Aguado
|-
| 1957||Alfredo F. Olivera
|-
| 1958||Antonio Bachini
|-
| 1959||Walter Estrada Degrandi
|-
| 1960||Walter Estrada Degrandi
|-
| 1961||Walter Estrada Degrandi
|-
| 1962||Eduardo Etcheverry
|-
| 1963||Alfredo F. Olivera
|-
| 1964||Guillermo R. Puiggrós
|-
| 1965||José Luis Alvarez del Monte
|-
| 1966||Walter Estrada Degrandi
|-
| 1967||Walter Estrada Degrandi
|-
| 1968||José Luis Alvarez del Monte
|-
| 1969||Pedro Lamas
|-
| 1970||Luis Roux Cabral
|-
| 1971||Roberto Silva Nazzari
|-
| 1972||Pedro Lamas
|-
| 1973||Walter Estrada Degrandi
|-
| 1974||Otto Benítez
|-
| 1975||Otto Benítez
|-
| 1976||José Bademian
|-
| 1977||Walter Estrada Degrandi
|-
| 1978||Juan C. Viana
|-
| 1979||Walter Estrada Degrandi
|-
| 1980||Manuel Dienavorian
|-
| 1981||Alejandro Bauzá
|-
| 1982||Daniel Rivera
|-
| 1983||Ivo Kurtic
|-
| 1984||Bernardo Roselli Mailhe
|-
| 1985||Daniel Rivera
|-
| 1986||Bernardo Roselli Mailhe
|-
| 1987||Manuel Dienavorian
|-
| 1988||Enrique Almada
|-
| 1989||Enrique Almada
|-
| 1990||Bernardo Roselli Mailhe
|-
| 1991||Daniel Perchman
|-
| 1992||Daniel Izquierdo
|-
| 1993||Bernardo Roselli Mailhe
|-
| 1994||Bernardo Roselli Mailhe
|-
| 1995||vacant (no match for the title, Roselli vs. Izquierdo)
|-
| 1996||Jorge Brasó
|-
| 1997||Alfonso Pérez
|-
| 1998||Bernardo Roselli Mailhe
|-
| 1999||Gabriel Curi
|-
| 2000||Bernardo Roselli Mailhe
|-
| 2001||Bernardo Roselli Mailhe
|-
| 2002||Bernardo Roselli Mailhe
|-
| 2003||Martín Crosa Coll
|-
| 2004||Bernardo Roselli Mailhe
|-
| 2005||Bernardo Roselli Mailhe
|-
| 2006||Daniel Izquierdo
|-
| 2007||Bernardo Roselli Mailhe
|-
| 2008||Bernardo Roselli Mailhe
|-
| 2009||Bernardo Roselli Mailhe
|-
| 2010||Manuel Larrea
|-
| 2011||Bernardo Roselli Mailhe
|-
| 2012||Andrés Rodríguez
|-
| 2013||Manuel Larrea
|-
| 2014||Nicolas Lopez Azambuja
|-
| 2015||Manuel Larrea
|-
| 2016||Bernardo Roselli Mailhe
|-
| 2017|| Bernardo Roselli Mailhe
|-
| 2018||Andrés Rodríguez
|-
| 2019|| Bernardo Roselli Mailhe
|-
|2020
|Bernardo Roselli Mailhe
|-
|2021
|Bernardo Roselli Mailhe
|}

References
 List of champions
 
 
 

Chess national championships
Championship
1927 in chess
Recurring sporting events established in 1927
1927 establishments in Uruguay